Patrick McLoughlin was a set decorator and actor. He was nominated for two Academy Awards in the category Best Art Direction.

Selected filmography
McLoughlin was nominated for two Academy Awards for Best Art Direction:
 Becket (1964)
 Anne of the Thousand Days (1970)

References

External links
 
 

Set decorators
Possibly living people
Year of birth missing